Nakhichevanik or Nakhchivanly is a village de facto in the Askeran Province of the breakaway Republic of Artsakh, de jure in the Khojaly District of Azerbaijan, in the disputed region of Nagorno-Karabakh. The village has an ethnic Armenian-majority population, and also had an Armenian majority in 1989.

History 
The modern village was founded in the 15th century. During the Soviet period, the village was part of the Askeran District of the Nagorno-Karabakh Autonomous Oblast.

Historical heritage sites 
Historical heritage sites in and around the village include tombs from the 2nd–1st millennia BCE, the village of Varder from between the 16th and 19th centuries, the 17th-century church of Surb Astvatsatsin, and an 18th/19th-century cemetery.

Economy and culture 
The population is mainly engaged in agriculture and animal husbandry. As of 2015, the village has a municipal building, a house of culture, a secondary school, and a medical centre.

Demographics 
The village had 211 inhabitants in 2005, and 222 inhabitants in 2015.

Notable people 
 Nikolay Karakhan (1900–1970) — Armenian  People's Painter of the Uzbek SSR
 Poghos Bek-Pirumyan (1856–1921) — Armenian military commander and national hero
 Daniel Bek-Pirumian (1861–1921) — Armenian military commander and national hero

References

External links 
 
 

Populated places in Askeran Province
Populated places in Khojaly District